Noel Quayle Cringle OBE (16 December 1937 – 28 August 2021) was President of Tynwald, the legislature of the Isle of Man, from 2000 to 2011.

Cringle was born and raised in Ballabeg, educated at Castle Rushen High School and became a farmer and later an auctioneer (Central Marts Limited). Married to Mary, with two sons. He was an Arbory Parish Commissioner from 1964 to 1974. He was first elected a Member of the House of Keys in 1974 as a member for Rushen. He lost his seat in 1986, whilst Chairman of the Home Affairs Board, but regained it in 1991, continuing as a Member for Rushen until 2000. From 1996 to 2000 he was Speaker of the House of Keys. From 2000 to 2011 he was President of Tynwald, and thus a member of the Legislative Council.

He was appointed Officer of the Order of the British Empire (OBE) in the 2008 New Year Honours. He died on 28 August 2021 at the age of 83.

Governmental positions
Member of the Executive Council, 1978–1981
Chairman of the Board of Social Security, 1976–1982
Chairman of the Home Affairs Board, 1982–1986
Member of the Executive Council, 1982–1986
Chairman of the Telecommunications Commission, 1984–1986
Chairman of the Civil Service Commission, 1992–1996
Minister of Education, 1995–1996

Other positions
Chairman IOM Sports Council 1982–1987
Chairman Manx Music Festival 1984–
Treasurer Manx National Farmers Union 1969–2000
President Manx Harriers Athletic Club
Trustee Colby AFC
Life Member Laa Columb Killey
Life Member Island Games Association

See also
Tynwald

References

External links 
Tynwald — The Parliament of the Isle of Man

1937 births
2021 deaths
Members of the House of Keys 1971–1976
Members of the House of Keys 1976–1981
Members of the House of Keys 1981–1986
Members of the House of Keys 1991–1996
Members of the House of Keys 1996–2001
Members of the Legislative Council of the Isle of Man
Officers of the Order of the British Empire